Wellspring University is a private university, licensed by the Federal Government of Nigeria in November 2009. It is located in Benin City, Edo state, Nigeria.  The university was founded by the Management Science Centre, a Professional Training and Educational Consulting Firm established in 1983.
The university was established on firm Christian beliefs and principles to provide a well-rounded education capable of enabling students develop valuable intellectual knowledge and practical life skills with sound morals.
The university currently runs its undergraduate programmes in its four colleges and its postgraduate programmes in its postgraduate school. All the academic programmes of the university are accredited by the National Universities Commission, and the university was rated third among the second generation private universities in 2019 according to NUC Webometric Ranking, 2019.(National Universities Commission, 2019).

History 
In 1983, a group of academics and professionals came together in Lagos to establish Management Science Centre. The vision of the centre was to render private tutorials to the teeming population of working men and women who had the common problem of inability to leave their employments to undertake full-time tertiary education.
The Centre commenced operations on a modest scale with the private coaching of students of the University of Lagos Correspondence and Open Studies Institute (COSIT), later renamed Distance Learning Institute.
By 1995, the modest foundation of 1983 had brought Management Science Centre into joint relationships with reputable institutions of higher learning in Nigeria, including:
a)	Auchi Polytechnic, Auchi, Edo State, for Certificate courses;
b)	University of Ibadan, Oyo State, for Diploma courses
c)	Ambrose Alli University, Edo State, for undergraduate and postgraduate degree courses.

The achievements in the above programmes gave rise to a desire to expand into other tiers of education in the country. The result was the establishment of:
Wisdom Gate High School which was established in 2001 and 
Wellspring College which was established in 2003

Both schools placed great emphasis on spiritual and moral upbringing in addition to academic excellence of students.
The driving force behind our dream has been our resolve to establish a centre of learning excellence where Nigerian youths yearning for quality education fortified with sound moral and spiritual principles, can find fulfilment. Thus, after more than thirty years in the education sector, the Centre considered itself adequately equipped and experienced to operate a full-fledged university. To the glory of God, in 2009, the Federal Government granted the operating license of Wellspring University.

Convocation 
The university had its first combined convocation ceremony on 22–25 March 2017, with Amb. Daniel C. Isimoya as pro-chancellor, Prof. F.E Obi Ikediugwu as Vice Chancellor and Barr (Mrs.) Edith Emmamezi Efam as Registrar. The Chancellor, Pastor Ituah Ighodalo, was conferred with a Doctor of Letters degree at the university. The then governor of Lagos State, His Excellency, Mr. Akinwumi Ambode delivered the convocation lecture and four eminent Nigerians namely: Dr. Uyi Akpata, Chief (Dr.) Innocent Ifediaso Chukwuma, Dr. Ambriosie Bryant Chukwueloka and Dr. Dorry Afe Okojie were honoured with the doctorate degrees of the university.
The second combined convocation took place in June, 2021 where three distinguished Nigerians namely: Major-General (Dr.) Umaru Mallam Mohammed, Major-General (Dr.) Charles Ehigie Airhiavbere and Dr. Oluwagbemiga Oyebode received the honorary doctorate degrees of the university.

Academic programmes 
The university has four colleges and runs the courses as indicated below in the colleges:

The College of Natural and Applied Sciences 
Microbiology
Biochemistry

The College of Computing 
Computer science
Information technology
Cyber security
Software engineering

The College of Health Sciences 
Nursing sciences
Medical laboratory science

The College of Social and Management Science 
Accounting
Taxation
Mass communication
Business administration
Hotel management
Entrepreneurship
Economics
International relations
Public administration

Student Life 
Wellspring University operates a student centered philosophy where students are given best opportunities to develop intellectually, socially and spiritually. The students’ affairs division of the university works to ensure that students get the best in terms of neat and secure environment and that they are respected, protected and their rights are not compromised. 
The division interfaces with various organisations and institutions which have one form of business or the other with students and facilitates scholarships, vacation jobs, employment and admission into higher degrees for the students. The university generally make the welfare of students a priority and our students have seen a very pleasant experience on campus. The division also facilitates the spiritual and godly training of the students.

See also 
Academic libraries in Nigeria

References

External links
Wellspring University Official Website

Christian universities and colleges in Nigeria
2009 establishments in Nigeria
Educational institutions established in 2009
Education in Benin City